Ubangi Young Workers (abbreviated JTO) was a youth movement in Ubangi-Shari/Central African Republic. The organization was founded in 1956. JTO was a union of young workers and struggled against imperialism. JTO was a member organization of the World Federation of Democratic Youth.

JTO was repressed and banned during the presidency of David Dacko.

References

Youth organizations established in 1956
Organisations based in the Central African Republic